Stephen Wilson (born 1941) is an English historian. He was Reader in European History at the University of East Anglia, Norwich. His 1995 book  Feuding, Conflict and Banditry in Nineteenth-Century Corsica was awarded the Prix du Livre Corse in 1996.

Wilson earned his doctorate from the University of Cambridge in 1967 for his thesis The Historians of the Action Française". He authored articles in history, historiography and religion.

Books
 (with B.C. Southam) The Magical Universe: Everyday Ritual and Magic in Pre-Modern Europe, First edition: Hambledon and London, 2000, 
The Means Of Naming: A Social and Cultural History of Naming in Western Europe First edition: 1998,  - The book gives a background of European naming, with major attention to pre-1500s period.
Feuding, Conflict and Banditry in Nineteenth-Century Corsica,  Cambridge University Press, 2003, 
(French language) Vendetta et banditisme en Corse au dix-neuvième siècle, 1995, 2002
Ideology and Experience: Antisemitism in France at the Time of the Dreyfus Affair, 2007,  (first edition: 1982 by Rutherford, London and Toronto)—The 1982  book was influential for the recognition of the effect of the undercurrent of antisemitism in French society on the Dreyfus Affair among the historians.

References

Living people
20th-century English historians
Academics of the University of East Anglia
Alumni of the University of Cambridge
1941 births